The 2022 World Sprint Speed Skating Championships were held at the Vikingskipet in Hamar, Norway, from 3 to 5 March 2022.

Schedule
All times are local (UTC+1).

Medal summary

Medal table

Medalists

References

External links
Official website

 
World Sprint Speed Skating
World Sprint Championships
2022 Sprint Speed Skating Championships
World Sprint Speed Skating
2022 World Sprint Speed Skating Championships
2022 Sprint